Danish singer-songwriter Oh Land has recorded material for five studio albums and guest features. She has also released an EP and a soundtrack album, and appeared as a featured artist for songs on other artists' releases. After solely writing and independently issuing Fauna in 2008 with Fake Diamond Records, Oh Land released her eponymous second studio album in 2011. Oh Land explored dance and modern pop music and featured contributions from a variety of producers. It peaked at number five on the Danish Albums Chart, and became certified platinum for sales of 20,000 copies in December 2012. Oh Land additionally peaked at number 184 on the United States' Billboard 200, becoming her first and only album to do so. Five singles were released from the effort, with three of them ("Sun of a Gun", "White Nights", and "Speak Out Now") peaking within the top forty of the single charts in Denmark; "Sun of a Gun" also landed the number twelve spot on Billboards Dance Club Songs chart. Oh Land's "otherworldy vocals" and "lush soundscapes" on the album drew comparisons to the music of Björk, La Roux, and Lykke Li. She was featured three times on Danish rock band Kashmir's sixth studio album Trespassers (2010), on "Bewildering in the City", "Mouthful of Wasps", and "Pallas Athena". In 2011, Oh Land contributed guest vocals to "Life Goes On", a promotional single for The Papercut Chronicles II (2011) by Gym Class Heroes.

The singer spent a two-year hiatus preceding the release of Wish Bone in 2013. The record similarly contained music from the pop genre, and was announced alongside the release of three singles: "Renaissance Girls", "Pyromaniac", and "Cherry on Top". It featured contributions from American musician Dave Sitek and its material was compared to the works of Robyn and Goldfrapp. Additionally, Sitek's work with the singer was outed for not being radio-friendly and instead focused on "strange" and "unidentifiable instrumentation" in order to create unique songs. Oh Land's fourth studio album, Earth Sick, was released in 2014 and promoted by singles "Head Up High" and "Nothing Is Over". As a whole, the record had a much "darker" tone and the songs relied less on the Scandipop genre. Because of her use of synths on Earth Sick, similarities between the singer and Goldfrapp continued. Oh Land was the lone writer for "Love a Man Dead", "Next Summer", and "Renaissance Girls" on Wish Bone while she solely wrote all of the tracks from Earth Sick except for "Machine" and "Nothing Is Over". She also was one of the artists who contributed to the 2015 compilation album Toppen af Poppen 2015, where she sang six covers of previously released songs. In 2016, Oh Land independently released a soundtrack containing music for a Danish revival of the Cinderella ballet tale, titled Askepot. The compilation contains twelve songs, all of which are performed solely by the singer. Dúné collaborated with the singer in 2016 for the song "Fall Back", which is featured on their fourth studio album Delta (2016). Following the announcement that the singer would release her fifth studio album in 2018, she released a soundtrack titled Watermusic featuring thirteen original compositions created for a theatre piece detailing the relationship between romance and water.

Songs

References

External links 
Oh Land songs at AllMusic

Songs recorded by Oh Land
Oh Land